Jesús Tirso Blanco (3 June 1957 – 22 February 2022) was an Argentine Roman Catholic prelate.

Blanco was born in Argentina and was ordained to the priesthood in 1985. He served as bishop of the Roman Catholic Diocese of Lwena, Angola from 2008 until his death in 2022. Blanco died on 22 February 2022, at the age of 64.

References

External links

1957 births
2022 deaths
21st-century Roman Catholic bishops in Argentina
21st-century Roman Catholic bishops in Angola
Roman Catholic bishops of Lwena